Roy Kehl Thomas (June 16, 1887 – May 23, 1977) was an American football, basketball, and baseball coach.  He was the seventh head football coach at Fairmount College—now known as Wichita State University—located in Wichita, Kansas and he held that position for three seasons, from 1909 until 1911.  His record at Fairmount was 15–8–2.  The 1911 team finished the season with a record of 7–1.  They were declared the Kansas Collegiate Athletic Conference champions.  Thomas coached the football team at Ohio Wesleyan University in 1913.

Thomas died at Traverse City, Michigan in 1977 after a long illness.

Head coaching record

Football

References

External links
 Olivet Athletic Hall of Fame profile
 

1887 births
1977 deaths
American football halfbacks
American men's basketball players
Basketball coaches from Michigan
Basketball players from Michigan
Ohio Wesleyan Battling Bishops football coaches
Olivet Comets football players
Olivet Comets men's basketball players
People from Leelanau County, Michigan
Wichita State Shockers baseball coaches
Wichita State Shockers football coaches
Wichita State Shockers men's basketball coaches